Van Stadens Pass is situated in the Eastern Cape, province of South Africa, on the R102 regional route, between Port Elizabeth and Humansdorp. It is a passage through the gorge of the Van Stadens River.

References

External links

Mountain passes of the Eastern Cape